Cirsium helenioides, the melancholy thistle, is an Asian and Arctic species of plants in the tribe Cardueae within the family Asteraceae. The species is native to Greenland (but considered extinct from Greenland since 1960), Iceland, Norway, Sweden, Finland, Russia, Xinjiang, Kazakhstan.

Cirsium helenioides is a perennial plant herb up to 120 cm (48 inches) tall, usually not branched, blooming only once before dying. Leaves are green on top, woolly underneath, with thin spines along the edges. There is one flower head per plant, with purple (occasionally white) disc florets but no ray florets.

References

External links
Gesamtverzeichnis des Herbariums besteht aus drei Spezialverzeichnissen: Cirsium helenioides, Verschiedenblättrige Kratzdistel photo
Flowers in Sweden, Cirsium helenioides, SE: Brudborste, DE: Verschiedenblättrige Kratzdistel, NL: Ongelijkbladige distel, UK: Melancholy Thistle in Swedish with photos
Slowlife, Photo Gallery / Flowers: Swedish Lapland, Cirsium helenioides Melancholy thistle Zweifarbige Kratzdistel Borsttistel, Brudborste
Jyväskylän yliopiston avoin yliopisto, Veikko Salonen & Petri Heinonen, Huopaohdake (Cirsium helenioides) in Finnis with photos

helenioides
Flora of North European Russia
Flora of East European Russia
Flora of Kazakhstan
Flora of Altai (region)
Flora of Xinjiang
Flora of Mongolia
Flora of Greenland
Plants described in 1753
Taxa named by Carl Linnaeus